Milton Ángel Busto García (born April 19, 1982) is a Nicaraguan professional midfielder currently playing for Walter Ferretti.

Club career
A versatile player, Busto has played in attack, midfield and defense for several clubs in the Nicaraguan premier division, most notable 5 years with Diriangén. He did not play in Xilotepelt's relegation play-off defeat by Chinandega in June 2011 and rejoined his first club Walter Ferretti.

Motorcycle accident
In summer 2013 he was injured in an accident with a motorcycle also involving teammate Josué Quijano.

International career
Busto made his debut for Nicaragua in an April 2004 friendly match against Bermuda and has, as of December 2013, earned a total of 11 caps, scoring 2 goals. He has represented his country in 1 FIFA World Cup qualification match and played at the 2005, 2007 and 2011 UNCAF Nations Cups.

His final international was a January 2011 Copa Centroamericana match against Guatemala.

International goals
Scores and results list Honduras' goal tally first.

References

External links
 
 Profile - FENIFUT

1982 births
Living people
People from Masaya
Association football midfielders
Nicaraguan men's footballers
Nicaragua international footballers
C.D. Walter Ferretti players
Diriangén FC players
2005 UNCAF Nations Cup players
2007 UNCAF Nations Cup players
2011 Copa Centroamericana players